Vernon Ronald Stauble (born 1 February 1950) is a former Trinidad cyclist. He competed at the 1968 Summer Olympics and the 1972 Summer Olympics.

References

External links
 

1950 births
Living people
Trinidad and Tobago male cyclists
Olympic cyclists of Trinidad and Tobago
Cyclists at the 1968 Summer Olympics
Cyclists at the 1972 Summer Olympics
Sportspeople from Port of Spain
Cyclists at the 1970 British Commonwealth Games
Commonwealth Games medallists in cycling
Commonwealth Games bronze medallists for Trinidad and Tobago
20th-century Trinidad and Tobago people
Medallists at the 1970 British Commonwealth Games